Shweta Mohan (born 19 November 1985) is an Indian playback singer. She has received four Filmfare Awards South for Best Female Playback Singer, one Kerala State Film Awards and one Tamil Nadu State Film Awards. She has recorded songs for film music and albums in all the four South Indian languages namely, Malayalam, Tamil, Telugu, Kannada along with the Hindi language and has established herself as a leading playback singer of South Indian cinema. Some of her inspirations are Sujatha Mohan (her mother), Alka Yagnik and K.S. Chitra

Film songs

2007

2008

2010

2011

2012

2013

2014

2015

2016

2017

2018

2019

References

External links 
 Shweta Mohan Kannada songs on Raaga

Kannada
Mohan, Shweta